Alexandr Dymovskikh (born 5 August 1983) is a Kazakh cyclist.

Major results
2005
 2nd Overall Tour of Greece
2006
 1st Team time trial, Asian Games
2009
 1st Overall Tour du Maroc
1st Stage 1

References

1983 births
Living people
Kazakhstani male cyclists
Asian Games medalists in cycling
Cyclists at the 2006 Asian Games
Asian Games gold medalists for Kazakhstan
Medalists at the 2006 Asian Games
20th-century Kazakhstani people
21st-century Kazakhstani people